The Ollinger-Cobb House is a historic residential building located at 302 Pine Street in Milton, Santa Rosa County, Florida. On January 11, 1983, it was added to the U.S. National Register of Historic Places.

In 1989, the house was listed in A Guide to Florida's Historic Architecture, published by the University of Florida Press.

References

External links
 Santa Rosa County listings at National Register of Historic Places
 Santa Rosa County listings at Florida's Office of Cultural and Historical Programs

Houses on the National Register of Historic Places in Florida
National Register of Historic Places in Santa Rosa County, Florida
Houses in Santa Rosa County, Florida